Sweden chose their entrant for Eurovision Song Contest 1969 through Melodifestivalen 1969. A tie occurred between two songs, but after additional voting, the song "Judy, min vän" with Tommy Körberg was selected. It was written by Roger Wallis and Britt Lindeborg. The other song, "Hej clown" was written by Lasse Berghagen and later ABBA member Benny Andersson.

At ESC, held in Madrid, Tommy finished 9th out of 16. Most points came from Sweden's neighbours, Norway and Finland. Sharing the 9th place was Germany, represented by the Swedish singer Siw Malmkvist, who had also represented Sweden in 1960. She did, however, not get any points from Sweden.

Before Eurovision

Melodifestivalen 1969 
Melodifestivalen 1969 was the selection for the 11th song to represent Sweden at the Eurovision Song Contest. It was the 10th time that this system of picking a song had been used. 2,402 songs were submitted to SVT for the competition. The final was held in the Cirkus in Stockholm on 1 March 1969, hosted by Pekka Langer and was broadcast on TV1 but was not broadcast on radio. This was the first time a tie occurred for first place in the competition.

At Eurovision

Voting

References

External links
ESCSweden.com (in Swedish)
Information site about Melodifestivalen
Eurovision Song Contest National Finals

1969
Countries in the Eurovision Song Contest 1969
1969
Eurovision
Eurovision